Gertrude Williams may refer to:
 Gertrude Rosenblum Williams, economist and social strategist
 Gertrude Marvin Williams, American biographer and journalist